Union athlétique de Marseille, commonly known as UA Marseille, was a French basketball club from the city of Marseille. The club existed from 1940 to 1949. It competed in the top-tier level French League, and won the league's championship in 1948.

Honours 

French League
 Champions (1): 1947–48
French League 2
 Champions (1): 1946–47

Notable players 
  André Buffière
  François Németh
  Robert Busnel
  René Chocat

 Basketball teams in France
 Sport in Marseille